Patricia A. Burrowes Gomez (born 1961) is an American herpetologist. She is a professor of biology at the University of Puerto Rico, Río Piedras Campus where she serves as principal investigator of the Amphibian Disease Ecology Lab. Burrowes specializes in amphibian population dynamics.

Early life and education 
Burrowes was born in 1961. In 1986, during her graduate studies, Burrowes and her doctoral advisor William E. Duellman collected specimens in Colombia and co-wrote A new species of marsupial frog (Hylidae: Gastrotheca) from the Andes of Southern Colombia. She completed a M.A. in systematics and ecology in 1987 at University of Kansas. Her graduate thesis was titled An ecological study of a cloud forest herpetofauna in southern Columbia. Burrowes earned a Ph.D. in ecology and systematics in 1997 at University of Kansas. Her 1997 dissertation was titled The reproductive biology and population genetics of the cave-dwelling Puerto Rican frog, Eleutherodactylus cooki.

Career and research 
In 2003, Burrowes began working with amphibians in Puerto Rico and the Dominican Republic. She was a professor in the biology department at University of Puerto Rico at Cayey and is currently a professor of biology at the University of Puerto Rico, Río Piedras Campus where she serves as principal investigator of the Amphibian Disease Ecology Lab. Burrowes specializes in amphibian population dynamics. In April 2019, Burrows and a team of student researchers published a study in Science about a mycosis causing a dramatic population decrease in at least 501 species of amphibians.

References

External links 
 

Living people
1961 births
Place of birth missing (living people)
American herpetologists
American women biologists
Women herpetologists
University of Kansas alumni
University of Puerto Rico faculty
20th-century American biologists
21st-century American biologists
20th-century American women scientists
21st-century American women scientists
American women academics